The Citizens' Group on Electoral Process (CGEP) is a Pakistani organisation created to ensure that free, fair and credible elections take place in the country. The first Chairman of the CGEP was Chief Justice (R) Saeeduzzaman Siddiqui.

References

Political organisations based in Pakistan
Election and voting-related organizations